Pool B (Tallinn) of the 2020–21 Billie Jean King Cup Europe/Africa Zone Group I was one of four pools in the Europe/Africa zone of the 2020–21 Billie Jean King Cup. Four teams competed in a round robin competition, with the top teams and the bottom team proceeding to their respective sections of the play-offs: the top teams played for advancement to 2020 Billie Jean King Cup Play-offs.

Standings 

Standings are determined by: 1. number of wins; 2. number of matches; 3. in two-team ties, head-to-head records; 4. in three-team ties, (a) percentage of matches won (head-to-head records if two teams remain tied), then (b) percentage of sets won (head-to-head records if two teams remain tied), then (c) percentage of games won (head-to-head records if two teams remain tied), then (d) Fed Cup rankings.

Round-robin

Italy vs. Austria

Estonia vs. Greece

Italy vs. Estonia

Austria vs. Greece

Italy vs. Greece

Estonia vs. Austria

References

External links 
 Fed Cup website

2020–21 Billie Jean King Cup Europe/Africa Zone